The Bavarian Ersatz Division (Bayerische Ersatz Division) was a Bavarian division of the Imperial German Army in World War I. It was formed in August 1914 and dissolved on 6 October 1918. It was initially a Bavarian formation but soon received several non-Bavarian units which served with the division until 1917.

Combat narrative

The division first saw action in 1914 in the Battle of the Frontiers, including the battles before Nancy and Epinal. The division participated in the Race to the Sea and then settled into trench warfare. The divisional commander, General der Infanterie Eugen Ritter von Benzino, was killed in action on November 28, 1915. In 1916, the division entered into the Battle of Verdun and fought on the Somme in October. The division also was engaged in 1917 in the Second Battle of the Aisne, also called the Third Battle of Champagne and referred to in German sources as the Dual Battle of Aisne-Champagne (Doppelschlacht Aisne-Champagne). After a short spell in the trenches near Verdun, in the latter part of 1917, the division was sent to Flanders in response to the Allied offensive there. In October 1917, the division went to the Romanian Front and then to Ukraine after the armistice in Romania. It returned to the Western Front in April 1918, occupying the line near Verdun, then Reims and then engaged in mobile defense. It ended the war facing Allied forces in the Hundred Days Offensive. The division was rated as a third class division by Allied intelligence.

Formation and organization on mobilization

On mobilization, the Bavarian Army formed twelve Brigade Replacement Battalions (Brigade-Ersatz-Bataillone) by grouping companies taken from the replacement (Ersatz) battalion of each infantry regiment. These battalions were then formed into three mixed brigades of four battalions each, together with Ersatz cavalry, artillery and engineer units, which were formed from the replacement detachments and companies of the cavalry and artillery regiments and the engineer battalions.

The order of battle of the Bavarian Ersatz Division on mobilization was:
 Stab/1. Königlich Bayerische gemischte Ersatz-Brigade
 Königlich Bayerisches Brigade-Ersatz-Bataillon Nr. 1
 Königlich Bayerisches Brigade-Ersatz-Bataillon Nr. 2
 Königlich Bayerisches Brigade-Ersatz-Bataillon Nr. 3
 Königlich Bayerisches Brigade-Ersatz-Bataillon Nr. 4
 Kavallerie-Ersatz-Abteilung München/I. Königlich Bayerisches Armeekorps ( squadron)
 Königlich Bayerische Feldartillerie-Ersatz-Abteilung Nr. 1 (2 batteries)
 Königlich Bayerische Feldartillerie-Ersatz-Abteilung Nr. 4 (2 batteries)
 2. Ersatz-Kompanie/Königlich Bayerisches 1. Pionier-Bataillon
 Stab/5. Königlich Bayerische gemischte Ersatz-Brigade
 Königlich Bayerisches Brigade-Ersatz-Bataillon Nr. 5
 Königlich Bayerisches Brigade-Ersatz-Bataillon Nr. 6
 Königlich Bayerisches Brigade-Ersatz-Bataillon Nr. 7
 Königlich Bayerisches Brigade-Ersatz-Bataillon Nr. 8
 Kavallerie-Ersatz-Abteilung Landau/II. Königlich Bayerisches Armeekorps ( squadron)
 Königlich Bayerische Feldartillerie-Ersatz-Abteilung Nr. 2 (2 batteries)
 Königlich Bayerische Feldartillerie-Ersatz-Abteilung Nr. 12 (2 batteries)
 Stab/9. Königlich Bayerische gemischte Ersatz-Brigade
 Königlich Bayerisches Brigade-Ersatz-Bataillon Nr. 9
 Königlich Bayerisches Brigade-Ersatz-Bataillon Nr. 10
 Königlich Bayerisches Brigade-Ersatz-Bataillon Nr. 11
 Königlich Bayerisches Brigade-Ersatz-Bataillon Nr. 12
 Kavallerie-Ersatz-Abteilung Nürnberg/III. Königlich Bayerisches Armeekorps ( squadron)
 Königlich Bayerische Feldartillerie-Ersatz-Abteilung Nr. 8 (2 batteries)
 Königlich Bayerische Feldartillerie-Ersatz-Abteilung Nr. 10 (2 batteries)
 1. Ersatz-Kompanie/Königlich Bayerisches 3. Pionier-Bataillon

Organizational changes and late-war organization

The 5th Mixed Replacement Brigade (5. gemischte Ersatz-Brigade) was transferred to the 30th Reserve Division on August 17, 1914.

The order of battle of the Bavarian Ersatz Division on September 15, 1914 was:

Bavarian Ersatz Division
 1st Bavarian Ersatz Brigade
 1st, 2nd, 3rd & 4th Bavarian Brigade Ersatz Battalions
 Bavarian Reserve Infantry Regiment 4 (four battalions)
 Cavalry Ersatz Abteilung Munich ( sq.)
 1st & 4th Bavarian Field Artillery Ersatz Abteilungen (four batteries)
 2nd Ersatz Co./Bavarian Pioneer 1
 9th Bavarian Ersatz Brigade
 9th, 10th, 11th & 12th Bavarian Brigade Ersatz Battalions
 Bavarian Reserve Infantry Regiment 15
 II. Battalion/ Reserve Infantry Regiment 60
 Cavalry Ersatz Abteilung Nuremberg ( sq.)
 8th & 10th Bavarian Field Artillery Ersatz Abteilungen (four batteries)
 1st Ersatz Co./Bavarian Pioneer 3
 Divisional Troops
 3rd Squadron/ Reserve Hussar Regiment 9
 Bavarian Cavalry Ersatz Abteilung
 Bavarian Field Artillery Ersatz Abteilungen 1 (two batteries), 2 & 3 (each three batteries)
 7th Battery/ Foot Artillery Rgt. 13 (10-cm cannons)
 3rd Battery/ Reserve Foot Artillery 13 (heavy field howitzers)
 2nd Bavarian Ersatz Pioneer Company

On October 3, 1914, the new Bavarian 3rd Reserve Brigade joined the division from the 30th Reserve Division. In addition, the 1st and 9th Mixed Replacement Brigades were redesignated as the 1st and 9th Replacement Brigades and their cavalry, artillery and engineer units were moved to division level. Three battalions from each brigade were reorganized into Kgl. Bayer. Ersatz-Infanterie-Regiment Nr.1 (1st Replacement Brigade) and Kgl. Bayer. Ersatz-Infanterie-Regiment Nr.3 (9th Replacement Brigade). Prior to November 20, these two regiments were transferred to "Division von Rekowski" (which later became the 39th Bavarian Reserve Division). Kgl. Bayer. Ersatz-Infanterie-Regiment Nr.2 was formed from two battalions of the 5th Mixed Replacement Brigade as well as troops drawn from elsewhere in the Bavarian Army; it was attached to the Bavarian Ersatz Division.

On November 22, 1914, the 59th Replacement Infantry Brigade (Ersatz-Infanterie-Brigade), a non-Bavarian unit, was renamed the 59th Landwehr Infantry Brigade (59. Landwehr-Infanterie-Brigade) and attached to the Bavarian Ersatz Division.

On December 10, 1914, the division consisted of:
 Bavarian 3rd Reserve Infantry Brigade:
 Bavarian Reserve Infantry Regiment 4 (4 battalions)
 Bavarian Reserve Infantry Regiment 15
 59th Landwehr Infantry Brigade
 Landwehr Infantry Regiment 120
 Ersatz Infantry Regiment 28
 Divisional Troops
 Cavalry Ersatz Abteilungen des I, II & III Bavarian A.K.
 Bavarian Field Artillery Ersatz Abteilungen 1, 2, 12
 1st Battery/Bavarian Field Artillery Ersatz Abteilung 4
 2d Battery/Bavarian Field Artillery Ersatz Abteilung 8
 1st Company/Reserve Pioneer Battalion 15

The organization of the division on April 7, 1918 was as follows:
 3.Kgl. Bayer. Reserve-Infanterie-Brigade:
 Kgl. Bayer. 4. Reserve-Infanterie-Regiment
 Kgl. Bayer. 15. Reserve-Infanterie-Regiment
 Kgl. Bayer. 18. Reserve-Infanterie-Regiment
 1. Eskadron/Kgl. Bayer. 6. Reserve-Kavallerie-Regiment
 Kgl. Bayer. Artillerie-Kommandeur 19:
 Kgl. Bayer. Ersatz-Feldartillerie-Regiment
 Fußartillerie-Bataillon Nr. 89
 Stab Kgl. Bayer. 13. Pionier-Bataillon:
 Kgl. Bayer. 4. Landwehr-Pionier-Kompanie
 Kgl. Bayer. 6. Landwehr-Pionier-Kompanie
 Kgl. Bayer. 100. Minenwerfer-Kompanie
 Kgl. Bayer. Divisions-Nachrichten-Kommandeur 551

Notes

References

 Bayerische-Ersatz-Division
 Histories of Two Hundred and Fifty-One Divisions of the German Army which Participated in the War (1914–1918), compiled from records of Intelligence section of the General Staff, American Expeditionary Forces, at General Headquarters, Chaumont, France 1919 (1920)
 Hermann Cron et al., Ruhmeshalle unserer alten Armee (Berlin, 1935)
 Hermann Cron, Geschichte des deutschen Heeres im Weltkriege 1914–1918 (Berlin, 1937)
 

Military units and formations established in 1914
Military units and formations of Bavaria
Military units and formations disestablished in 1919
1914 establishments in Germany
Infantry divisions of Germany in World War I